Parasipyloidea is a genus of phasmids belonging to the family Lonchodidae.

Species 
The Phasmida Species File list:
Parasipyloidea aenea 
Parasipyloidea carinata 
Parasipyloidea emeiensis 
Parasipyloidea exigua 
Parasipyloidea ficta 
Parasipyloidea galbina 
Parasipyloidea jinggangshanensis 
Parasipyloidea minuta 
Parasipyloidea montana 
Parasipyloidea nigrimarginata 
Parasipyloidea novaeguineae 
Parasipyloidea rugulosa 
Parasipyloidea seiferti 
Parasipyloidea shiva 
Parasipyloidea sinensis 
Parasipyloidea zehntneri

References

Lonchodidae
Phasmatodea genera